The Switzerland women's national handball team is the national team of Switzerland. It takes part in international handball competitions.

The team has yet to participate in a World championship, but will participate in a European championship for the first time in 2022. Switzerland will co-host in 2024 along with Hungary and Austria.

Record

World Championship
Switzerland has never appeared in the World Championship and has yet to qualify.

European Championship
Switzerland never competed in the European Championship before. It will participate for the first time in 2022 and co-host in 2024 on home soil with Hungary and Austria.

Current squad
The squad for the 2022 European Women's Handball Championship.

Head coach:  Martin Albertsen

References

External links

IHF profile

National team
Handball
Women's national handball teams